The Business Association of Stanford Entrepreneurial Students (BASES) is a student group at Stanford University focusing on business and entrepreneurial activities. One of the largest student-run entrepreneurship organizations in the world, BASES' mission is to promote entrepreneurship education at Stanford University and to empower student entrepreneurs by bringing together the worlds of entrepreneurship, academia, and industry. BASES organizes the flagship 150K Challenge, Entrepreneurial Thought Leaders' Seminar, the SVI Hackspace, E-Bootcamp, and the Freshman Battalion.

BASES was founded in 1996 by a group of five Stanford engineers. The organization works in partnership with Silicon Valley's venture capitalists and law firms to provide a variety of entrepreneurial services to Stanford students.

Competitions
BASES hosts two annual business plan competitions, one catering to for-profit startups (E-Challenge) and the other for social ventures (Social E-Challenge). It hosts a third, concurrent product showcase competition for product prototypes. A total of $150,000 is awarded each year in these competitions. Entirely student-managed, the competition attracts students from all programs and levels at Stanford. Teams must include at least one full-time Stanford student, but participation is not restricted to the Stanford community. Past winners include:

Entrepreneurship bootcamp 
BASES hosts a five-day conference for 100 students at Stanford University. E-Bootcamp includes pitching and design workshops, marketing initiatives, media rundowns, sector-specific critiquing and mentoring sessions with industry leaders. Attendees present their business plans and products in a competitive environment, including a product showcase and pitch competition, attended by investors.  The four top-performing entrepreneurs  receive a prize. E-Bootcamp is partnered with Sequoia Capital and New Enterprise Associates.

Speaker series 
Entrepreneurial Thought Leaders is a class in the Management Science and Engineering department jointly hosted by BASES, the Stanford Technology Ventures Program (STVP), and the Stanford Center for Professional Development. The weekly lecture series exposes Stanford students to insights from entrepreneurs, investors, CEOs, and innovators from Silicon Valley. Guest speakers in the past have included Larry Page, John Doerr, Mark Zuckerberg, and Steve Ballmer.

References

External links
BASES
Stanford Technology Ventures Program

Stanford University
Stanford University student organizations
Recurring events established in 1990
Business plan competitions
Student organizations by university or college in the United States